Allantoma kuhlmannii, synonym Cariniana kuhlmannii, is a species of woody plant in the Lecythidaceae family. It is found only in Brazil. It is threatened by habitat loss.

References

Sources

Lecythidaceae
Flora of Brazil
Critically endangered plants
Taxonomy articles created by Polbot
Taxa named by Adolpho Ducke